"Real Good Man" is a song written by Rivers Rutherford and George Teren and recorded by American country music singer Tim McGraw.  It was released in May 2003 as the fourth single from McGraw’s 2002 album Tim McGraw and the Dancehall Doctors.  The song reached number one on the US Billboard Hot Country Singles and Tracks (now Hot Country Songs) chart.

Content
The narrator states to his significant other that while he may be a "bad boy", he is a "real good man".

Critical reception
Rick Cohoon of Allmusic reviewed the song favorably, saying that the song "offers a unique melody." Cohoon goes on to say that McGraw can "party with the best of 'em" but also "touts his softer side complete with soft-as-velvet hands and a patriotic spirit."

Music video
The music video, directed and produced by Sherman Halsey, and premiered on CMT on July 12, 2003. It was filmed live in concert, and was released as a double-song video with "The Ride," a cover of the David Allan Coe hit.  A special promotional single of this double-song performance was sent to radio stations.  While the live version of "Real Good Man" did eventually appear on McGraw's Greatest Hits 3 CD, it did not contain "The Ride"; "The Ride" would appear on McGraw's 2016 "Ultimate Collection" 4 disc set.

Chart positions
"Real Good Man" debuted at number 60 on the U.S. Billboard Hot Country Singles & Tracks for the chart week of May 17, 2003.

Year-end charts

Certifications

References

2003 singles
Tim McGraw songs
Songs written by Rivers Rutherford
Song recordings produced by Byron Gallimore
Song recordings produced by Tim McGraw
Music videos directed by Sherman Halsey
Curb Records singles
2002 songs
Songs written by George Teren